The South Carolina School for the Deaf and the Blind is a school in unincorporated Spartanburg County, South Carolina, United States, near Spartanburg and with a Spartanburg postal address. It was founded in 1849 by the Reverend Newton Pinckney Walker as a private school for students who were deaf. The School for the Blind was established in 1855, and the school became state funded in 1856.

Previously students were under de jure educational segregation in the United States with black students separate. In 1967 the school racially integrated.

The School for the Multihandicapped was established in 1977, and the school began providing outreach services in the mid-1980s.

Walker Hall

Walker Hall was designed by noted Charleston architect Edward C. Jones and built about 1857–1859, is a brick building with Greek Revival and Italian Villa design elements.  A west wing, designed by Philadelphia architect Samuel Sloan was added in 1885. The front façade features a pedimented portico supported by Corinthian order columns. A rear annex was built in 1921.

Walker Hall was listed on the National Register of Historic Places in 1977.

Campus
The school has dormitories available. They are for students living outside of the Spartanburg area counties.

Transportation
Boarding students are transported between campus and their houses on weekends while day students in the Spartanburg area are transported every day.

References 

Schools for the deaf in the United States
Schools for the blind in the United States
Schools in Spartanburg County, South Carolina
Public elementary schools in South Carolina
Public middle schools in South Carolina
Public high schools in South Carolina
Public K-12 schools in the United States
School buildings on the National Register of Historic Places in South Carolina
School buildings completed in 1859
Buildings and structures in Spartanburg, South Carolina
National Register of Historic Places in Spartanburg, South Carolina
1849 establishments in South Carolina
Public boarding schools in the United States
Boarding schools in South Carolina